Caverns of Mars is a vertically scrolling shooter for the Atari 8-bit family of home computers. It was programmed by Greg Christensen, with some features added by Richard Watts, and published by the Atari Program Exchange (APX) in 1981. Caverns of Mars became the best selling APX title of all-time and was moved into Atari, Inc.'s official product line, first on diskette and later on cartridge.

The game is a vertically scrolling variation of Konami's 1981 arcade game Scramble. In Caverns of Mars, the player descends into cave and at the end must retrace their steps back to the top. Christensen wrote two less successful sequels, one of which scrolls horizontally and is very similar to Scramble.

Gameplay 

Caverns of Mars is a scrolling shooter similar in concept and visual style to the 1981 arcade game Scramble. Christensen changed the orientation of the caverns from Scramble, having the player fly down into them as opposed to sideways through them. Unlike Scramble, rockets in Caverns of Mars remain on the ground.

Using a joystick, the player controls a ship descending into the tunnels of Mars, firing at targets along the way. The player's spacecraft has two cannons, positioned on either side of the craft, firing downwards. The player needs to avoid hitting the cavern walls, while shooting targets of opportunity along the way. Fuel tanks can be shot to add 5 points of fuel, and the craft is destroyed if it runs out.

There are several different sections of the map, with easier skill levels removing the more difficult sections from the areas through which the player has to fly. The easiest skill level has only three sections, the hardest has six. On any skill level the last section of the map is a reactor, which the player lands on and thereby sets to explode. The player then has to reverse course and fly up and out of the caverns to escape before the reactor explodes.

Development 
Greg Christensen, a high-school senior, purchased an Atari 800 in 1981, and created Caverns in "little more than a month and a half"—the first significant program he wrote in 6502 assembly language. Fred Thorlin of Atari Program Exchange recalled Caverns arriving at APX:

In the original version, when the player reaches the end of the selected map, the game ends. Thorlin felt it needed something more. Christensen was too busy, but agreed use his royalties to pay for someone else to do the work. Thorlin hired Richard Watts of Macrotronics to make a number of modifications. This included a new ending in which the player has to fly back out of the cavern in reverse before a timer runs out.

Two months after sending it to APX, Christensen received his first royalty check for $18,000, and a phone call from an Atari executive who praised the game. Caverns eventually won the 1981 APX game contest, winning another $3,000, and in December 1982, Atari told Christensen he might receive up to $100,000 in royalties.

Atari licensed the game in early 1982 for distribution in the main Atari catalog on diskette. This was the first APX to Atari move, among very few examples in total. When asked to collaborate on a cartridge-based port, Christensen declined, having started college. Atari released the cartridge version in 1983.

Reception 
Computer Gaming World called Caverns of Mars "delightful ... addictive and excellently paced". It noted the age of the author and stated that the game "has all the look, feel, and play of a 'professional' program". Softline liked the game's use of checkpoints after losing a life, and concluded "This game is great; you'll find it difficult to pull yourself away". Compute! called Caverns of Marss graphics "impressive … an excellent use of the Atari's graphics capabilities," noting that the game takes advantage of a little-used mode allowing four colors per character. A Creative Computing reviewer opened with "Four minutes later. I was hooked. Four hours later, my wife dragged me away." and concluded by noting that "The Caverns of Mars has that indefinable "something" that makes it arcade-quality". The Addison-Wesley Book of Atari Software 1984 gave the game an overall B+ rating, calling it "fast-paced and addictive" and "great fun ... a must for any dedicated arcade game player". Electronic Fun gave it a 3.5 out of 5 rating, praising the action and pointing out only a few minor flaws.

Caverns of Mars received a Certificate of Merit in the category of "Best Science Fiction/Fantasy Computer Game" at the 4th annual Arkie Awards,

Legacy

Mars Mission II
Christensen followed Caverns in 1981 with a lesser-known sequel, known originally as Caverns of Mars II. This version is very similar to Scramble, scrolling horizontally and with rockets that launch upwards from the ground. The game was completed in 1981, but it was not released. It would not be published until several years later by Antic Software as Mars Mission II.

Phobos
Combining the vertical orientation of the original Caverns with the improved graphics of Caverns II, Phobos was released through APX in 1982, although there are other minor modifications as well. The levels are divided into sub-levels with letters as names; after being killed the action restarts at the top of the sub-level, as opposed to the top of the whole level. The system is similar to the one used in Moon Patrol. 

Softline stated that Phobos might disappoint Caverns of Mars players, stating that it was "a reinvention of the wheel" and too easy for them. The magazine noted some improvements, such as a pause button and multiple skill levels, but advised that "Mars veterans should wait". The Addition-Wesley Book of Atari Software 1984 gave the game an overall B rating, stating that "whether it is a better game than the original is debatable" and concluding that "it is a good choice for the dedicated arcade game player".

Re-releases
In 2005, a version of Caverns of Mars was included on the Atari Flashback 2 classic game console.

In 2023, the game is set for a March release for Microsoft Windows, Nintendo Switch, PlayStation 4, PlayStation 5, Xbox One and Xbox Series X/S, under the title Caverns of Mars: Recharged.

Clones
Datamost's Cavern Creatures (1983) for the Apple II is very similar. Conquest of Mars (2006) for the Atari 2600 is a direct clone.

References

Bibliography

External links 
 Caverns of Mars 1982 Atari, Inc. version at Atari Mania
 Caverns of Mars, play-through on Novice settings

1981 video games
Atari Program Exchange software
Atari 8-bit family games
Atari 8-bit family-only games
Vertically scrolling shooters
Video games developed in the United States
Single-player video games